Events of 2021 in Zimbabwe.

Incumbents
President: Emmerson Mnangagwa
Vice President
Constantino Chiwenga (1st)
Kembo Mohadi (2nd, until March 1)

Events
Ongoing: COVID-19 pandemic in Zimbabwe
January 13 – COVID-19 pandemic: Traditional funerals are banned as infections increase.
January 19 – President Mnangagwa says the United States has no standing to impose sanctions on Zimbabwe following the 2021 United States Capitol attack.
January 24 – COVID-19: A fourth member of the Cabinet of Zimbabwe dies in two weeks.
January 27 – Journalist Hopewell Chin'ono is released on bail after three weeks in prison. Chin’ono accuses Mnangagwa's administration of human rights abuses and corruption; the government accuses Chin’ono of spreading false information and inciting violence.
March 1 – Second vice president Kembo Mohadi resigns after allegations of sexual misconduct.

Scheduled events

Deaths
12 January – Lazarus Takawira, 68, sculptor; COVID-19.
15 January – Ellen Gwaradzimba, 60, Minister for Manicaland; COVID-19.
19 January – Stephen Lungu, 78, evangelist; COVID-19.
20 January – Sibusiso Moyo, 61, politician, Ministry of Foreign Affairs; COVID-19.
22 January – Aeneas Chigwedere, 81, politician, Minister of Education (2001–2008) and Governor of Mashonaland East (2008–2013); COVID-19.
22 January – Joel Matiza, 60, politician, Minister for Transport and Infrastructural Development; COVID-19.
22 January – Paradzai Zimondi, 73, former major-general and commissioner-general of Zimbabwe's prisons and corrections services; COVID-19.
25 January – David Katzenstein, 69, international HIV and global health expert based in Harare; COVID-19.
16 February – Soul Jah Love (real name Soul Musaka), 31, Zimdancehall singer; diabetes.
7 March – Janice McLaughlin, 79, Maryknoll sister and human rights campaigner.
25 June – Ahmed Bilal Shah, 67, medical doctor and TV presenter; COVID-19.
7 July – Edzai Chimonyo, 68, commander of the Zimbabwe National Army; cancer.
13 July – Sandra Nyaira, 46, investigative journalist; COVID-19.
14 & 19 July – Helen Lieros, 81, painter, followed by her husband Derek Huggins, 80. Together they founded Harare's Gallery Delta.
29 July – Janet Banana, 83, former First Lady; kidney failure.
6 August – Jane Ngwenya, 86, politician.
7 August – Robert Martin Gumbura, 65, disgraced religious leader and convicted rapist; COVID-19.
24 August – George 'Mastermind' Shaya, 72, five-time Soccer Star of the Year.
9 September – Christopher Mapanga, 69, Zimbabwe's ambassador to Iran.
14 November – Simon Khaya-Moyo, 76, former Zanu–PF spokesperson, cabinet minister and ambassador; cancer.
29 November – Douglas Munatsi, 51, CEO of Zimbabwe Investment and Development Agency; carbon monoxide poisoning following house fire.

See also

COVID-19 pandemic in Africa
African Continental Free Trade Area

References

External links
 World Report 2021: Zimbabwe

 
2020s in Zimbabwe
Years of the 21st century in Zimbabwe
Zimbabwe